Stephanie Reilly (née O'Reilly, born 23 February 1978 in Dublin, Ireland) is an Irish long distance runner who competed at the 2012 Summer Olympics in the 3000 metres steeplechase.

Running career

She went to Providence College in Rhode Island, United States on an athletic scholarship in 1997. A 2001 Graduate of Providence, she was a member of two New England Championship Teams in 1998 and 1999 and one BIG EAST Conference Championship team in 1997. Named Indoor Track Team Captain in 2000 and Outdoor Captain in 2001, she was an NCAA provisional qualifier in the 3000 meters in 1998. In 2004, she received her master's degree in Guidance and Counseling from Providence College.

Reilly's success at an International Level continued into 2011 with a strong performance at the New York Diamond League, running Running a PB of 9:42:91 in the 3000m Steeplechase achieving both an A Standard for both the IAAF 2011 World Championships in Daegu & more importantly the 2012 Olympic Games in London.

Reilly qualified for the 2012 Summer Olympics in the 3000 metres steeplechase. She finished 27th out of 44 runners in the initial heats, and did not qualify for the final.

Achievements

Coaching
Reilly began her first year as interim head men's and women's cross country and track & field coach at Bryant University in 2007–08, having previously served as an assistant coach during the 2006–07 season. After serving as the interim head coach for the 2007–08 season, she was appointed Head Coach of the Bryant Men's and Women's Cross Country / Track and Field Teams in July, 2008.

Reilly followed up her Olympic experience with a record setting 2012–13 season for the Bryant Bulldogs. It started in the fall as Reilly engineered one of the best seasons in Bulldog cross country history at the DI level. She led the women's cross country team to a third-place team finish on her way to Northeast Conference Coach of the Year honors. This momentum carried the Bulldogs into the track and field seasons where Reilly's squad rewrote the record book. In all, the Bulldogs set 13 school records during the indoor and outdoor track and field seasons.

Reilly is now the Head Women's Track & Field and Assistant Men's and Women's Cross Country coach at her alma mater, Providence College.

References

External links
IAAF Profile
RTE Profile

1978 births
Living people
Sportspeople from Dublin (city)
Irish female long-distance runners
Irish female steeplechase runners
Olympic athletes of Ireland
Athletes (track and field) at the 2012 Summer Olympics